Watershed districts are special government entities in the U.S. state of Minnesota that monitor and regulate the use of water in watersheds surrounding various lakes and rivers in the state.  The districts cover the natural regions of the watersheds, rather than politically defined regions and thus may have boundaries that cross jurisdictions.  They are run by a board of managers, who are appointed by commissions in the counties within the districts.

The districts were first authorized by Minnesota state legislation in 1955.  As of November 2016 there are 45 districts in the state.  District boards coordinate activities with the state, as well as with the counties, cities, and soil and water conservation districts within the watershed districts. In comparison with public bodies in other countries, watershed districts are most similar to the internal drainage boards of England and Wales, Waterschappen of the Netherlands, and Consorzi di bonifica e irrigazione of Italy.

List of current watershed districts in Minnesota
 Bear Valley Watershed District
 Belle Creek Watershed District
 Bois de Sioux Watershed District
 Browns Creek Watershed District
 Buffalo Creek Watershed District
 Buffalo-Red River Watershed District
 Capitol Region Watershed District
 Carnelian-Marine Watershed District
 Cedar River Watershed District
 Clearwater River Watershed District
 Comfort Lake-Forest Lake Watershed District
 Coon Creek Watershed District
 Cormorant Lakes Watershed District
 Crooked Creek Watershed District
 Heron Lake Watershed District
 High Island Creek Watershed District
 Joe River Watershed District
 Kanaranzi-Little Rock Watershed District
 Lac Qui Parle-Yellow Bank Watershed District
 Lower Minnesota River Watershed District
 Middle Fork Crow River Watershed District
 Middle-Snake-Tamarac Rivers Watershed District
 Minnehaha Creek Watershed District
 Nine Mile Creek Watershed District
 North Fork Crow River Watershed District
 Okabena-Ocheda Watershed District
 Pelican River Watershed District
 Prior Lake-Spring Lake Watershed District
 Ramsey-Washington Metro Watershed District
 Red Lake Watershed District
 Rice Creek Watershed District
 Riley-Purgatory-Bluff Creek Watershed District
 Roseau River Watershed District
 Sand Hill River Watershed District
 Sauk River Watershed District
 Shell Rock River Watershed District
 South Washington Watershed District
 Stockton-Rollingstone Watershed District
 Turtle Creek Watershed District
 Two Rivers Watershed District
 Upper Minnesota River Watershed District
 Valley Branch Watershed District
 Warroad Watershed District
 Wild Rice Watershed District
 Yellow Medicine River Watershed District

External links
 Minnesota Association of Watershed Districts
 Enabling Legislation—Minnesota Statue 103D
 Minnesota Board of Water and Soil Resources

Local government in Minnesota
Natural regions
Water management authorities in the United States
Watersheds of the United States